Alice Stone Ilchman (April 18, 1935 – August 11, 2006) was an American academic administrator who worked as the eighth president of Sarah Lawrence College from 1981 to 1998.

Early life and education 
Ilchman was born in Cincinnati to Donald Crawford Stone, was an educator and federal planner in the Roosevelt and Truman administrations. She earned a Bachelor of Arts degree in religion from Mount Holyoke College in 1957, a Master of Public Administration from Syracuse University's Maxwell School of Citizenship and Public Affairs in 1958, and a Ph.D. from the London School of Economics in 1965.

Career
Ilchman directed Peace Corps training projects at the University of California, Berkeley and taught South Asian studies there. She later taught and was a dean at Wellesley College. She later served as assistant secretary of state for educational and cultural affairs under former President Jimmy Carter in 1978. Ilchman was the director of the Jeannette K. Watson Fellowship until her death.

Personal life 
Ilchman was married to Warren F. Ilchman, a political economist and former president of Pratt Institute. They had two children, Frederick and Sarah.

On August 11, 2006, Ilchman died at her home in Bronxville, New York due to complications from pancreatic cancer. She was 71 years old.

See also 
 List of presidents of Sarah Lawrence College

References

External links
Alice Stone Ilchman papers archived at Sarah Lawrence College
Jeannette K. Watson Fellowship
Obituary at Sarah Lawrence College website 

1935 births
2006 deaths
Alumni of the London School of Economics
Presidents of Sarah Lawrence College
Mount Holyoke College alumni
Deaths from cancer in New York (state)
Deaths from pancreatic cancer
Educators from Cincinnati
American women educators
People from Bronxville, New York
Maxwell School of Citizenship and Public Affairs alumni
Assistant Secretaries of State for Education and Culture
20th-century American women
20th-century American people
21st-century American women
Women heads of universities and colleges
20th-century American academics